Lady Elish Frances Angiolini  (née McPhilomy; born 24 June 1960) is a Scottish lawyer. She was the Lord Advocate of Scotland from 2006 until 2011, having previously been Solicitor General since 2001. She was the first woman, the first Procurator Fiscal, and the first solicitor to hold either post. Since September 2012, Angiolini has been the Principal of St Hugh's College, Oxford. She has been a Pro-Vice-Chancellor of the University of Oxford since 2017 and was Chancellor of University of the West of Scotland from 2013 to 2021. Since leaving office she has led several investigations and inquiries, including a review of deaths in police custody commissioned by the then-Home Secretary Theresa May.

Early life and education
Angiolini was born on 24 June 1960 to Mary (née Magill) and James McPhilomy. She grew up in Govan, Glasgow; her father was a coal merchant and later worked for Rolls-Royce and then as a commercial driver. As a child she wanted to be a ballet dancer. One of her first summer jobs was working on a checkout at Marks & Spencer. She was educated at Notre Dame High School for Girls in the West End of the city, and studied at the School of Law of the University of Strathclyde, obtaining an LLB (Hons) in 1982 and a Diploma in Legal Practice in 1983.

Angiolini's first encounter with the legal profession came when, as a teenager, she was asked to give evidence in a burglary trial. Later, she recalled: "I was not terribly impressed. There were a lot of important people in gowns and witnesses were left a very long time in the witness room and not given any information... All the attention was focused on the permanent figures of the court, while ... witnesses, and those in the dock, seemed irrelevant". The experience inspired Angiolini to pursue a career in law. Later as Regional Procurator Fiscal, Angiolini piloted a victim liaison scheme which was subsequently extended throughout Scotland.

Early legal career
Upon completing her legal studies, she joined the Crown Office and Procurator Fiscal Service to train as a Procurator Fiscal (public prosecutor). Whilst a trainee, she survived the Polmont rail accident; two passengers sitting next to her were killed.

Following her training, Angiolini spent 8 years as a Depute Procurator Fiscal in Airdrie, prosecuting in Airdrie Sheriff Court. In 1992, she was seconded to the Crown Office where she worked in the Lord Advocate's Secretariat. During her secondment, she developed an interest in improving the support offered to vulnerable victims and witnesses, and in particular to children. She was then appointed Senior Depute Procurator Fiscal at Glasgow, taking operational responsibility for Sheriff and Jury prosecutions. In 1995, she was promoted to Assistant Procurator Fiscal at Glasgow.

In 1997, Angiolini returned to the Crown Office as Head of Policy, with responsibility for the development of policy across all functions of the Department. In particular, she helped the department prepare for devolution and was involved in the preparation of the Scotland Act 1998. At the same time, Angiolini was responsible for the department's preparations for the introduction of the Human Rights Act 1998.

She was then appointed Regional Procurator Fiscal for Grampian, Highland and Islands (based at Aberdeen) on 27 July 2000 – the first woman to hold such a post. In this role she piloted a victim liaison scheme which was subsequently extended across the country.

Solicitor General
Angiolini was appointed Solicitor General for Scotland by First Minister Jack McConnell in 2001. Angiolini was the first solicitor, as opposed to advocate, to be appointed Solicitor General; this was not received favourably amongst all members of the legal profession.

In 2006, Jack McConnell praised Angiolini's work as Solicitor General, saying the decision to appoint her had been one of the best he had ever made.

Lord Advocate
Following the resignation of Lord Boyd, First Minister Jack McConnell nominated Angiolini for the post of Lord Advocate. Her nomination was passed by Parliament on 5 October 2006, with 99 in favour, 0 against and 15 abstentions. She was sworn in at the Court of Session on 12 October 2006 and one month later she was made a member of the Privy Council.

After the 2007 election there was speculation that the new SNP administration might replace Angiolini. On the morning after the election, Angiolini had cleared her office and was preparing to leave when she received a phone call from Alex Salmond, the new First Minister. Angiolini congratulated Salmond on his election, and said that she had packed up her things. "Unpack your things, and come and see me", replied Salmond. Salmond decided that Angiolini should stay in post, and would continue not to attend Cabinet except to provide advice or to make representations about her own department as had been the case with the former administration following the departure of her predecessor. Her reappointment was agreed by Parliament on 24 May 2007. This made her the first Lord Advocate to serve two different governments.

Later in 2007, Angiolini clashed publicly with the head of Scotland's judiciary, Lord President Hamilton, over the collapse of the World's End murders trial. The trial judge, Lord Clarke, had ruled there was insufficient evidence for the jury to convict and threw the case out. Angiolini then made a statement to the Scottish Parliament, saying she was "disappointed" at the decision, a move Hamilton said undermined the independence of the judiciary.

Angiolini announced in October 2010 that she would step down from the role of Lord Advocate after the Scottish Parliament elections in May 2011.

Alex Salmond paid tribute to Angiolini, saying "her term as Lord Advocate has been marked by significant improvements and substantial success in the disposal of justice in Scotland". She was succeeded on 19 May 2011 by Francis Mulholland.

Academic and charity work
On leaving the post of Lord Advocate, Angiolini was unveiled as the first patron of LawWorks Scotland, a charity which helps people who cannot afford legal advice.

In September 2011 it was announced that Angiolini was to become a visiting professor at Strathclyde Law School, her old university. As well as teaching undergraduates, she was to develop a masters course in advocacy studies.

Angiolini is a member of Terra Firma Chambers, with a particular interest in public administrative law and professional negligence.

In February 2012 it was announced that Angiolini would become Principal of St Hugh's College, Oxford in September 2012, replacing Andrew Dilnot.

Angiolini replaced Robert Smith, Baron Smith of Kelvin as Chancellor of the University of the West of Scotland in September 2013. until 2021. She was made a Pro-Vice-Chancellor of the University of Oxford in 2017.

Later work
Angiolini led an "investigation into the disposal of baby ashes at Mortonhall Crematorium" in 2013 after it was revealed that the remains of babies were being cremated with unrelated adults. She was subsequently asked by the Scottish Government to carry out an investigation into the practices of all crematoria across Scotland.

In 2015 her review on how the Crown Prosecution Service and Metropolitan Police Service investigate and prosecute rape cases in London was published.

Angiolini's report into deaths in custody in the UK, commissioned by the UK Home Office, was published at the end of October 2017.

In 2018 she was appointed by the Scottish government to "review the processes for handling complaints against the police and investigating serious incidents and alleged misconduct."

Angiolini will chair the 2022 independent inquiry into the murder of Sarah Everard.

Honours
In 2002, she was awarded Alumnus of the Year by the University of Strathclyde.

She was appointed Dame Commander of the Order of the British Empire (DBE) in the 2011 Birthday Honours for services to the administration of justice.

She holds honorary degrees of Doctor of Laws from the universities of Strathclyde, Glasgow Caledonian, Stirling, Aberdeen, St Andrews, West of Scotland, and the Open University. She is a fellow of the Royal Society of Arts and the Royal Society of Edinburgh (2017).

In June 2011, Angiolini received the Special Achievement Award from the International Association of Prosecutors.

On 10 June 2022, Angiolini was appointed a Lady of the Order of the Thistle (LT), the only non-Royal woman currently appointed to the order.

On the 24th November 2022, Angiolini was awarded The Herald's 'Lifetime Achievement Award' at the newspaper's Scottish Politician of the Year Awards, for outstanding contributions to public life.

Personal life
She married Scots Italian Domenico Angiolini in 1985; they have two children, Domenico and David. Her hobbies include walking, picking wild mushrooms and cinema.

See also
 First women lawyers around the world

References

External links
 Elish Angiolini profile, Gazetteer for Scotland

 
 
 

1960 births
Dames Commander of the Order of the British Empire
Alumni of the University of Strathclyde
Living people
Solicitors General for Scotland
Lord Advocates
Members of the Privy Council of the United Kingdom
Scottish women lawyers
Scottish solicitors
People from Govan
Scottish lawyers
Principals of St Hugh's College, Oxford
20th-century Scottish lawyers
21st-century Scottish lawyers
Women members of the Scottish Government
Women academic administrators
Women Law Officers of the Crown in the United Kingdom
20th-century women lawyers
21st-century women lawyers
20th-century Scottish women
Ladies of the Thistle